John Williams Mellor is a French-born American economist, known for his work in the field of economic and agricultural development in third world countries. In 1985, he was awarded the Wihuri International Prize, for his “constructive work that has remarkably promoted and developed the security of nutrient supply for mankind.” A Fulbright Scholar, he spent most of his academic career at his alma mater, Cornell University. In the early 1970s, he became an economist for USAID, eventually becoming their chief economist in 1976. After leaving USAID, he became the second director-general of the International Food Policy Research Institute in 1977, where he remained until 1990. He has authored numerous articles, and several books, chiefly regarding economic and agricultural development in third world countries. Currently he runs John Mellor Associates as well as being a professor emeritus at Cornell.

Biography
Mellor was born in Neuilly-sur-Seine, a suburb of Paris, France on December 28, 1928.  His parents were Desmond W. and Katherine (Beardsley) Mellor, and the family immigrated to the United States in 1929. He graduated from Okemos High School in Okemos, Michigan, before attending Cornell University. He received a bachelor of science degree (with distinction) from Cornell in 1950, followed by a M.Sc. in 1951, both in economics. As undergraduate, he was a member of Telluride House and Quill and Dagger. He attended Oxford University on a Fulbright Scholarship, where he obtained a diploma in agriculture economics, before returning to Cornell where he was awarded a Ph.D. (with distinction) in agricultural economics. While working towards his doctorate, he was selected as a fellow of the Social Science Research Council.

Career
After graduation, Mellor became a lecturer at his alma mater.  He worked in the following departments during his tenure at the university:Agricultural Economics, Economics, and Asian Studies.  He eventually attained the rank of professor, and eventual professor emeritus. From 1961–64, he was the associate director for the university's Center for International Studies, followed by becoming director in 1964–65. He was also the director of the University's Program on Comparative Economic Development between 1973–77. In the early 70s, he joined USAID as economist, eventually rising to become their chief economist in 1976, a post he held through 1977. While at USAID, during the world food crisis of 1973–74, Mellor's expertise and advice was crucial to the U.S. response to that crisis and the humanitarian efforts which were put forward. His influence was also fundamental in the creation of the International Food Policy Research Institute  in 1975, of which he became their second director-general in 1977.  A post he held through 1991.  He has also served as a professor at the American University of Beirut, as well as at Balwant Rajput College in India. Mellor served as a member of the Agricultural Credit Commission for the Reserve Bank India between 1986–88, and then served on the board on agriculture at the National Academy of Sciences from 1989–1992.

Accomplishments
 American Agricultural Economics Association Award  - Best Published Research (1967)
 Fellow, American Academy of Arts and Sciences (since 1977)
 American Agricultural Economics Association Award - Publication of Enduring Quality (1978), for his 1967 book, The Economics of Agricultural Development
 Fellow, American Agricultural Economics Association (since 1980)
 Wihuri International Prize (1985)
 Presidential Award (The White House, USA)
 Fellow, American Association for the Advancement of Science

Significant publications

Books
Agricultural Development and Economic Transformation (2017) - Named one of the best economy books of 2017 by The Financial Times
Agricultural Price Policy for Developing Countries (1988)
Accelerating Food Production in Sub-Saharan Africa (1987)
The New Economics of Growth (1976)
The Economics of Agricultural Development (1967) - won the American Agricultural Economics Association award

Articles
While he has written (or co-written) hundreds of articles, these are some of his most cited:

"The World Food Equation: Interrelations Among Development, Employment, and Food Consumption" (1984 - co-authored with Bruce F. Johnston)
"Food Price Policy and Income Distribution in Low-Income Countries" (1978)
"The role of agriculture in economic development" - The American Economic Review (1961)

External links
 John W. Mellor on Researchgate

References

1928 births
People from Neuilly-sur-Seine
American development economists
Cornell University alumni
Alumni of the University of Oxford
Fellows of the American Academy of Arts and Sciences
American Association for the Advancement of Science
American agriculturalists
Cornell University faculty
Living people
French emigrants to the United States
American expatriates in the United Kingdom
American expatriates in Lebanon
American expatriates in India